Oncinocampa is a genus of two-pronged bristletails in the family Campodeidae. There are at least four described species in Oncinocampa.

Species
These four species belong to the genus Oncinocampa:
 Oncinocampa asonensis Sendra & Conde, 1988 g
 Oncinocampa bolivarurrutiai Sendra & Garcia g
 Oncinocampa falcifer Conde, 1982 g
 Oncinocampa genuitei Bareth, 1989 g
Data sources: i = ITIS, c = Catalogue of Life, g = GBIF, b = Bugguide.net

References

Further reading

 
 
 

Diplura